Jonty Maree Bush (born 25 June 1979) is an Australian politician currently serving as the Labor member for Cooper in the Queensland Legislative Assembly. Bush is a former public servant and community advocate, having served as the Chief Executive Officer of the Queensland Homicide Victims Support Group and was a manager in the Office of the Public Guardian, Victim Assist Queensland, and the Queensland Department of Justice and Attorney-General. She was awarded the 2009 Young Australian of the Year Award and was a member of the Queensland Sentencing Advisory Council between 2010 and 2012.

Early life and education
Born and raised in Austins Ferry, Tasmania, Bush attended Sunshine Coast University to earn a bachelor's degree in business and graduated from Griffith University in Queensland with a criminology master's degree.

Career

Community advocacy
In 2000, Bush joined the Queensland Homicide Victims Support Group as a volunteer after the deaths of her father and sister to violence. During her time with the company, Bush was promoted to Chief Executive Officer in 2007 and initiated an anti-violence campaign called One Punch Can Kill. In 2009, Bush moved to Brisbane and worked in youth violence prevention. The following year, Bush created a website on anti-violence awareness.  In 2012, Bush started Project 24, which focuses on fundraising for agencies that specialise in gender-based violence prevention. From June 2015 to June 2016, Bush worked on creating an online service called Kintsugi Centre that connects Australians who are experiencing trauma with psychotherapists.

Public service
Outside of advocacy, Bush was a member of the Queensland Sentencing Advisory Council from 2010 to 2012. Bush then joined the Queensland Public Service in 2010 as the Community Liaison and Research Officer of Victim Assist Queensland, an agency of the Queensland Department of Justice and Attorney-General. From 2015 to 2015, she then worked as the Principal Program Officer responsible for the Queensland Victim Coordination Program. In 2015, Bush joined the Office of the Public Guardian as the Practice Manager and then served as the Director of the Community Visitor Program from 2017 to 2018. From 2018 to 2020, Bush served as the Director of the Strategic Support Office for the Criminal Justice System Reform Framework Program Management Office in the Queensland Department of the Premier and Cabinet. In 2019, Bush also served as Acting Director of Victim Assist Queensland.

Brisbane City Council candidacy
At the 2020 Brisbane City Council election, Bush ran for the Enoggera Ward and was defeated by incumbent councillor Andrew Wines, despite a swing towards her.

State Parliament
In September 2020, Bush took Kate Jones's place as the Labor candidate for the electoral district of Cooper at the 2020 Queensland state election and was successful, winning her seat with a 10.5% margin. She serves a member of the Parliament's Legal Affairs and Safety Committee.

Labor Party executive
Bush was elected a vice-president of the Australian Labor Party Queensland Branch in 2020.

Personal life
Bush is in a de facto partnership and has four children.

Awards and honours
Bush won the 2009 Young Australian of the Year Award recognising her work in advocacy for victims of crime in Queensland.

References

1979 births
Living people
Griffith University alumni
Members of the Queensland Legislative Assembly
Australian Labor Party members of the Parliament of Queensland
21st-century Australian politicians
21st-century Australian women politicians
Politicians from Hobart
20th-century Australian people